FieldTurf is a brand of artificial turf playing surface. It is manufactured and installed by FieldTurf Tarkett, a division of French company Tarkett. FieldTurf is headquartered in Montreal, Quebec, Canada, and its primary manufacturing facility is located in Calhoun, Georgia, United States. With a design intended to more accurately replicate real grass, the new product rapidly gained popularity in the late 1990s.

History
Jean Prévost bought the patent of the FieldTurf product in 1988, and originally named his Montreal-based company SynTenni Co., a name which would eventually be dropped in favor of FieldTurf Inc. In 1995, John Gilman, a former Canadian Football League player and coach, joined FieldTurf as CEO.

In 2005, French flooring manufacturer and minority shareholder Tarkett increased its share in FieldTurf, which led to the integration of the two companies. FieldTurf is now a part of the Tarkett Sports division, part of the holding company Tarkett SA.

In May 2010, FieldTurf acquired the American company EasyTurf of San Diego, California, as a way to gain entry into the rapidly growing residential and commercial synthetic grass markets in the United States.

Product details

The surface is composed of monofilament polyethylene-blend fibers tufted into a polypropylene backing. The infill is composed of a bottom layer of silica sand, a middle layer which is a mixture of sand and cryogenic rubber, and a top layer of only rubber. The fibers are meant to replicate blades of grass, while the infill acts as a cushion. This cushion is intended to improve safety when compared to earlier artificial surfaces and allows players to plant and pivot as if they were playing on a grass field.

Each square foot of turf contains about 3 kg (7 lb) of sand and 1.5 kg (3 lb) of cryogenic rubber. FieldTurf does not use shock-absorbency pads below its infill. The backing of the turf is a combination of woven and nonwoven polypropylene. These materials are permeable and allow water to drain through the backing itself.

Safety
Some evidence shows higher player injury on artificial turf. In a study performed by the National Football League Injury and Safety Panel, published in the October 2012 issue of the American Journal of Sports Medicine, Elliott B. Hershman et al. reviewed injury data from NFL games played between 2000 and 2009. They wrote, "...the injury rate of knee sprains as a whole was 22% higher on FieldTurf than on natural grass. While MCL sprains did not occur at a rate significantly higher than on grass, rates of ACL sprains were 67% higher on FieldTurf."

Studies of the safety of FieldTurf are conflicting. A five-year study funded by FieldTurf and published in the American Journal of Sports Medicine found that injury rates for high-school sports were similar on natural grass and synthetic turf. However, notable differences in the types of injuries were found. Athletes playing on synthetic turf sustained more skin injuries and muscle strains, while those who played on natural grass were more susceptible to concussions and ligament tears. In 2010, another FieldTurf-funded but peer-reviewed study was published in the American Journal of Sports Medicine, this time on NCAA Division I-A football, concluding that in many cases, games played on FieldTurf-branded products led to fewer injuries than those played on natural grass.  However, the NFL's Injury and Safety Panel presented a study finding that anterior cruciate ligament (ACL) injuries happened 88% more often in games played on FieldTurf than in games played on grass.  In 2012, the Injury and Safety Panel published an independently funded analysis of actual game data over the 2000–2009 seasons. Their statistically significant findings showed a 67% higher rate of ACL sprains and 31% higher rate of eversion ankle sprains.

Uses

Gridiron football
The first installation of FieldTurf in the United States took place at Dick Bivins Stadium in Amarillo, Texas (which was the home field for the Amarillo Independent School District's football teams) in 1998. The first major college football installation was at University of Nebraska's Memorial Stadium in 1999. The following year, it was installed at the two Pac-10 stadiums: Martin Stadium in Pullman, Washington and Husky Stadium in Seattle. The first installation in an NFL (and by extension, professional) stadium was in 2002, at the Seattle Seahawks' new stadium, now known as Lumen Field. Originally planned to have a natural grass field, the Seahawks instead decided to install FieldTurf after they had played the two previous seasons in Husky Stadium on that surface.

Association football
FieldTurf's first high-profile installation came in January 1997 as English club Middlesbrough chose FieldTurf for its new training field. Only artificial fields with FIFA-recommended 2-star status can be used in FIFA and UEFA Finals competitions. Other FIFA and UEFA competitions require at least 1-star status.

In 2001, Boston University's FieldTurf soccer field became FieldTurf's first to obtain FIFA 1-star status. In 2005, Saprissa Stadium in San José, Costa Rica became the first stadium to host a FIFA World Cup qualifying match on FieldTurf. The Dundalk F.C. Stadium, Oriel Park, received FieldTurf's first FIFA 2-star rating. FieldTurf currently has 29 FIFA-recommended 1-Star installations and 31 FIFA Recommended 2-Star installations. In 2007, the FIFA U-20 World Cup Canada had almost 50% of its games played on FieldTurf.

Major League Soccer
The use of FieldTurf in Major League Soccer (MLS) has received criticism.

The installation of the surface at CenturyLink Field in Seattle was approved only after the operator of the then-new stadium agreed to install a natural grass field when needed. Their concern derived from the surface potentially hindering the city's ability to attract an MLS franchise and international soccer events.

In September 2006, several top Canadian soccer players appealed to the Canadian Soccer Association to install a natural grass surface at BMO Field in Toronto. The club removed the FieldTurf playing surface and switched to a traditional grass surface starting in 2010.

Following David Beckham's move to Major League Soccer in 2007, he voiced his opinion that the league should convert to grass for all pitches. In an apology, he stated that the surface is fine at lower levels, but that his feelings had not changed about the MLS use because of the toll the harder surface takes on the body. Thierry Henry never played at Seattle's CenturyLink Field during his time in MLS due to the surface.

Public works
A specialized version of FieldTurf called Air FieldTurf has been installed to cover the edges of runways at several airports.

See also
 AstroTurf
 Poly-Turf

References

External links
 

Artificial turf